The Minister of Education used to be a Minister in the Cabinet of South Africa, with the responsibility of overseeing the Department of Education, including South Africa's schools and universities. 

On 10 May 2009 newly elected president Jacob Zuma split the education portfolio into that of the Minister of Basic Education and that of the Minister of Higher Education and Training.

Ministers with responsibility for Education

Post-apartheid period

See also 
 Department of Education (South Africa)

References

External links 
 Ministry of Education
 Department of Education

Education
 
Lists of political office-holders in South Africa